Eugenijus Bartulis  (born December 7, 1949, in Kaunas) is a Lithuanian Roman Catholic prelate, who serves as a Bishop of Šiauliai.

Biography
In 1968, he graduated from the secondary school in Kaunas. He studied at the Kaunas Seminary in 1971–1976. Bartulis was ordained a priest on May 30, 1976. From 1976 to 1986, Bartulis worked as a vicar in the parishes of Kelmė, Radviliškis and Kaunas. In 1986–1989, he was pastor of the parishes of Deltuva and Bukonys. In 1989, Bartulis was appointed administrator of Kaunas Cathedral. In 1990, he was appointed chancellor of the curia of the Archdiocese of Kaunas. Afterwards, he was appointed pastor of one of the biggest parishes of Kaunas. Later he taught at the Kaunas Seminary and worked as spiritual director of the seminary. On June 1, 1996, Bartulis was appointed rector of Kaunas Seminary. On May 28, 1997, he was nominated and appointed ordinary bishop of the newly established Diocese of Šiauliai. He was consecrated bishop on June 29, 1997, in Kaunas Cathedral. In 2000–2010, he was also ordinary of the Military Ordinariate of Lithuania.

References

1949 births
20th-century Roman Catholic bishops in Lithuania
Clergy from Kaunas
Living people
21st-century Roman Catholic bishops in Lithuania
Military Ordinary of Lithuania